The 1986–87 County Championship was the 45th season of the Liga IV, the fourth tier of the Romanian football league system. The champions of each county association play against one from a neighboring county in a play-off  to gain promotion to Divizia C.

Promotion play-off 
Teams promoted to Divizia C without a play-off matches as teams from less represented counties in the third division.

 (MH) Celuloza Drobeta-Turnu Severin
 (SJ) Izomat Șimleu Silvaniei
 (BR) Progresul Brăila
 (VL) Dacia Metalul Râmnicu Vâlcea

 (IL) Victoria Munteni-Buzău
 (IS) Aurora Târgu Frumos
 (GR) Utilaje Grele Giurgiu

 Ilfov County did not enter a team in the play-offs.

The matches was played on 12 and 19 July 1987.

County leagues

Arad County

Hunedoara County

Maramureș County 
North Series

South Series

Championship final 
The championship final was played on 11 June 1987 at 23 August Stadium in Baia Mare.

Cuprom Baia Mare won the Maramureș County Championship and qualify to promotion play-off in Divizia C.

Neamț County

See also 
 1986–87 Divizia A
 1986–87 Divizia B
 1986–87 Cupa României

References

External links
 

Liga IV seasons
4
Romania